Binnie Peaks are twin peaks rising to  to the north of Romerof Head in western South Georgia. Named by the UK Antarctic Place-Names Committee after Edward Beveridge Binnie, second British resident magistrate, South Georgia, 1915–26, succeeding James Innes Wilson.

References
 

Mountains and hills of South Georgia